Ptyongnathosia lativalva is a species of moth of the family Tortricidae. It is found in Peru.

The wingspan is about 25 mm. The ground colour of the forewings is cream, slightly mixed with yellow brown and dotted brownish. The hindwings are cream, whiter basad and mixed with brownish towards the apex.

Etymology
The species name refers to the shape of the valve and is derived from Latin latus (meaning broad).

References

Moths described in 2010
Euliini